Frank Ronald Lobos Acuña (born September 25, 1976) is a Chilean former football player who played as a midfielder. His greatest achievement was reaching the third place at the 1993 U-17 World Cup. There he was one of the main figures of the Chilean team, along with Manuel Neira, Héctor Tapia, Sebastián Rozental, Dante Poli, Ariel Salas, Patricio Galaz, and Alejandro Osorio.

International career
He played for Chile in both the 1993 FIFA U17 World Championship in Japan, where Chile reached the third place, and the 1995 FIFA U20 Championship in Qatar. In addition, he took part of Chile squad in both the 1993 South American U17 Championship and the 1995 South American U20 Championship.

Personal life
Due to the fame he and his fellow players acquired after the 1993 U17 World Championship, he performed as a member of jury of the 1994 Viña del Mar International Song Festival and also acted in the TV series . In addition, he took part in the reality show  (Year Zero) in 2011.

Since 2015, he has performed as a football coach and motivational teller in the penitentiaries, organizing football games and other activities financed by the Ministry of Justice.

He has a close friendship with the former footballer Juan Carlos Alegría.

Controversies
He was punished by the Disciplinary Court of the ANFP with 10 years of total disability in everything that relates to professional football after being found guilty of bribery.

Honours

Club
Colo-Colo
 Chilean Primera División (3): 1996, 1997 Clausura, 1998
 Copa Chile (2): 1994, 1996

International
Chile U17
 FIFA U-17 World Cup Third place: 1993

References

External links

Frank Lobos at playmakerstats.com (English version of ceroacero.es)

1976 births
Living people
Footballers from Santiago
Chilean footballers
Chile youth international footballers
Chile under-20 international footballers
Chilean expatriate footballers
Colo-Colo footballers
Deportes La Serena footballers
Everton de Viña del Mar footballers
Deportes Concepción (Chile) footballers
Racing de Ferrol footballers
Mito HollyHock players
Puerto Montt footballers
CR Vasco da Gama players
Chilean Primera División players
Segunda División players
J2 League players
Campeonato Brasileiro Série A players
Chilean expatriate sportspeople in Spain
Chilean expatriate sportspeople in Japan
Chilean expatriate sportspeople in Brazil
Expatriate footballers in Spain
Expatriate footballers in Japan
Expatriate footballers in Brazil
Association football midfielders